The Inspector Erlendur Series is a popular murder mystery series featuring Reykjavik detective Erlendur Sveinsson. Written by Icelandic author Arnaldur Indriðason, the series is published in the U.S. by Minotaur Press and consists of more than a dozen novels.  Mýrin (Jar City), the third book in the series, was the first to be translated into English. Mýrin was also adapted as a 2006 film entitled Jar City, starring Ingvar Eggert Sigurðsson as Erlendur.

Note: Reykjavik Nights, while written later, is a prequel to the Inspector Erlendur series (#0).

Books
Synir duftsins (Sons of Dust), 1997.
Dauðarósir (Silent Kill), 1998.
Mýrin (Jar City), 2000.
Grafarþögn (Silence of the Grave), 2001.
Röddin (Voices), 2003.
Kleifarvatn (The Draining Lake), 2004 
Vetrarborgin (Arctic Chill), 2005
Harðskafi (Hypothermia), 2007 
Myrká (Outrage), 2008 
Svörtuloft (Black Skies),  2013 
Furðustrandir (Strange Shores), 2014
Einvígið (The Great Match), 2011
Reykjavíkurnætur, (Reykjavik Nights), 2012
 Kamp Knox (Oblivion), 2014

References

Series of books
Fictional police detectives